Artamonov is the name of a noble family of Scottish origin, descended from Art MacKeen (Russian: Арт Магин), a mercenary that was recruited to the regiment under the command of William Grim ( later under Captain-Rittmeister Jacob Shaw). He first entered service to the Polish-Lithuanian Commonwealth, but during the siege of the fortress of Bely in 1614, his regiment switched sides, surrendered the fortress and allied to Russia. Later on, the regiment participated in several Russo-Crimean Wars during the period of Crimean–Nogai raids. Ivan, son of Denis Artmanov, was mentioned as a Pomeschik in Vologda.

Notable members
Артамонов (1840–1918) was a military geodesist and a member of the Russian Astronomical Society. He was the Chief of the Corps of Military Topographers of the Russian Imperial Army.

References

Russian noble families
Russian families of Scottish origin